is a Japanese politician of the Democratic Party of Japan, a member of the House of Representatives in the Diet (national legislature). A native of Numazu, Shizuoka and graduate of Waseda University, he worked at the national newspaper Yomiuri Shimbun from 1987 to 1999. He was elected to the first of his two terms in the assembly of Shizuoka Prefecture in 1991 and then to the House of Representatives for the first time in 1996. He is an assenter of "The Truth about Nanjing(movie)."

References

External links 
 Official website in Japanese.

1961 births
Living people
People from Numazu, Shizuoka
Waseda University alumni
Members of the House of Representatives (Japan)
Democratic Party of Japan politicians
Members of Nippon Kaigi
Nanjing Massacre deniers
21st-century Japanese politicians